Richard Abels FRHistS  (born 1951) is professor emeritus of history at the United States Naval Academy. Abels is a specialist in the military and political institutions of Anglo-Saxon England. He was Elected Fellow of the Royal Historical Society (elected 1990).

Selected publications

Alfred the Great: War, Kingship and Culture in Anglo-Saxon England. London: Longman, 1998.
Æthelred the Unready: The Failed King. Penguin Monarchs Series, Penguin U.K., 2018.
Lordship and Military Obligation in Anglo-Saxon England. Berkeley and Los Angeles: University of California, 1988.
The Normans and their Adversaries: Essays in Memory of C. Warren Hollister. Co-edited with Bernard Bachrach.  Woodbridge, Suffolk: Boydell and Brewer, 2001.

Podcast: "'Tis But A Scratch: Fact & Fiction About the Middle Ages" (2022)

References

External links
 

United States Naval Academy faculty
Living people
1951 births
American military historians
Historians of England
Fellows of the Royal Historical Society